Christian Seidel is a German author and film producer. He has recently published books in 2010, 2011, 2014, 2016 and 2018, 2019. Most of his work has been subject to the contradiction of image and reality. The books of Christian Seidel are quoted as a part of the gender debate. His bestseller The woman inside of me, published by Random House in 2014, has been sold in many countries all over the world with special editions in Japan and Korea. In this book, he describes his three-year experiment to live as a woman. The book has been filmed by Iranian director Dariush Rafiy for Arte television ("Christian and Christiane", 90 min., 2015). With "Genderkey" (Ariston/Randomhouse, 2016), Seidel has published a significant analysis of the gender roles and their stereotypes, which he describes as "destructively dominating our lives, especially women's lives". "Genderkey" has caused a public debate in Germany, Austria and France. In interviews, the author has criticized the "phlegmatic behaviour of men within the gender debate. With his last work "Ich komme" ("I am coming") the author has initiated a critical debate about male sexuality, again accusing "the loud male silence" in the #metoo debate. Seidel is teaching about gender roles in seminars, as well as consulting the image of personalities.

Seidel's earlier book Winning without fighting published by Random House Publishing Group in 2011, is an autobiographical reflection about his personal rediscovery of the values of life. A path which took him on a journey through the training of martial arts TaekWonDo in Korea. Subsequently, in accordance with these principles and values, he changed his way of conducting his successful career as an international media manager.

In February 2015, Seidel presented his epic documentary movie Nebesna Sotnja (The Heavenly Hundred) in Kiew, Ukraine, on the occasion of the memorials of the massacres during the Maidan protests in Kyiv. The 90-minute documentary film tells the events of the Maidan protest movement in the Ukrainian capital of winter 2013/14 and its shootings as well as the stories of victims and their families, who have lost their fathers and mothers. Seidel, who was accidentally present on Maidan Nezalezhnosti at this time, has realized his movie as a producer and a director together with Austrian film producer Thomas Vacek. The picture has been considered as one of "the most authentic documents about the Maidan events" (Kyiv Post).

Christian Seidel has become known as a film producer after his production of the feature film The Biographer – The Secret Life of Princess Di (2002), a film noir-style feature film about Princess Diana, (director: Philip Saville, starring Paul Mc Gann, Faye Dunaway, Brian Cox and Hugh Bonneville). The picture based on the biography of Diana by Andrew Morton, published by Michael O'Mara in 1992, consequently causing a major scandal in the Royal Family. Together with British director Nicolas Roeg (Don’t look Now) Seidel produced the English art house film project The Sound of Claudia Schiffer (2001) for BBC2, starring Claudia Schiffer, music by Adrian Utley (Portishead). He later executive produced all other episodes of this engaging art project, directed by Werner Herzog, The Quay Brothers and Hal Hartley.

Life and career 

Christian Seidel has left music high school "Pestalozzi Gymnasium". He studied the sciences of theatre at the Ludwig Maximilian University in Munich and acting at the Munich acting school. After he began an acting career appearing in various theatres and movies, Seidel decided to become a writer, because as he said "I felt more free with writing on paper by myself, instead of acting out what others wrote" (Washington Herald, 1999) began to write about airports for pilot magazines, despite knowing nothing about flying. As a journalist, he published the first interview with Indian Guru Osho (also known as Bhagwan Shree Rajneesh) in magazines and newspapers worldwide. This work led him into the world of public relations, where he built a career as a public relations agent during the '80s and '90s. International success followed, because of his unique style of concept writing. This concept became the basis for financial backing of Andre Heller's Luna Luna fun fair spectacle of 1987. An extravagant 6 million marks luna park, which attracted internationally known artists: Andy Warhol, Keith Haring, Salvador Dalí and David Hockney, amongst many to participate. It was the most expensive public relations project of the time, financed by Heinrich Bauer Publishing.

Christian Seidel then started to manage news content for television stations. One of his best-known deals was the worldwide distribution of a private video, of two brothers who flew over the Berlin wall from East to West-Berlin with an ultralight aircraft. Seidel was the consultant of choice for various celebrities: Claudia Schiffer, Margaux Hemingway and Arabella Kiesbauer. As Executive Vice President of Program Marketing & Press of Germany's media giant Kirch Group, he was responsible for international marketing campaigns, such as "The Indiana Jones Chronicles" by George Lucas, the new version of the Scarlett television series and the "Junior"- label for children's movies without violence within the film group. Seidel also created the TV For Nature project, which was the first international television campaign for the environment in the 90ieths, with 36 television stations participating. He then became a producer for television programs and movies, producing hundreds of hours of talk-shows and television content for his company.

After Seidel survived a serious car accident in 2005, he stopped all his businesses and changed his life. He continued to pursue his personal passion, writing and the study of Asian philosophies. Seidel went to the Korean grandmaster Ko Eui-Min to learn the martial arts technique Tae Kwon Do. Thus developing an integrated technique for management coaching and leadership consulting, through the rediscovery of life values such as integrity, respect, awareness and their integration into modern business strategies. Together with scientists in Munich, he developed his awareness technique "Gaping" a modern concept of meditation, for the more valuable use of time for managers and busy people. In 2009, Seidel founded the V – Academy (Value Academy for a New Society). In 2012, Christian Seidel discovered the subject of "gender roles" as centre of his interest. That's why he has decided to start his experiment of living as a woman and to change his male role into a female role, thus exploring the world of femininity and the dimension of how much the role play of genders is affecting life and social behavior. One of the key quotes during his interviews is Christian Seidel's statement, that after he has realized, how deep discrimination of women still is, he notes that "the inequality of genders and their origin is one of the key reasons of all major problems in our world".

Publications 

Lippert, Manager the new Medici, Luna-Schizo-Luna, by Heyne Publishing, 1987

Help - Television programs, ProSieben Television, 1998

Arabella Night, Talkshow Series ProSieben Television, 1994 – 1996

The Biographer – The Secret Life of Princess Di, feature film, London, 2001

The Sound, Arthouse movie series for BBC2, London, 2002

Talk ohne Show – Political Talkshows N24, Berlin, 2005 - 2008

Seidel, Christian: Winning without fighting („Gewinnen ohne zu kämpfen), Random House, .

 References 

 Süddeutsche Zeitung, Franz Kotteder, "Leaving the fast lane" ("Runter von der Überholspur"), portrait about Christian Seidel, March 29, 2011 
 dpa, German Press Agency, Carsten Rave, "New Diana movie by Christian Seidel" August 21, 2007 
 Randomhouse Munich, Press Release, January 2011 
 "The Biographer" - Synopsis and production details. Website of ABC Australia, viewed on March 29, 2013. 
 "The Sound of Claudia Schiffer" - View full movie and details. zimbio.com, viewed on march, 29th, 2013 
 The Independent on Sunday, Chris Darke, "We have seen Claudia-now we can hear her", Feb 25, 2001 
 "Christian Seidel: Ex Kirch Manager rediscovers Life" ("Christian Seidel: Ex-Kirch-Manager entdeckt das Leben neu") German website, viewed on march, 29th, 2013 
 Kurier Austria, Andrea Hlinka, "Prehistorical bullshit", interview with Christian Seidel, April 2, 2011 
 dpa, German Press Agency, Carsten Rave, "film producer Christian Seidel leaves media industry", April 13th, 2011. 
 Medien Bulletin, Nicole Schrambke, March 1989 
 Sueddeutsche Zeitung, Hans-Juergen Jakobs, "Golden Egs"'' („Goldene Eier“), June 25, 2002
 Kiew Post, February 18, 2015

External links 
 Christian Seidel - About the author Random House Website, viewed on march, 29th, 2013
 Christian Seidel official Webpage

German film producers
Living people
German male writers
Year of birth missing (living people)
Film people from Munich